Alexander Fitzroy Dunstan (14 July 1885 – 20 November 1964) was an Australian rules footballer who played for the Collingwood Football Club in the Victorian Football League (VFL).

Notes

External links 

		
Alex Dunstan's profile at Collingwood Forever

1885 births
1964 deaths
Australian rules footballers from Melbourne
Collingwood Football Club players
Warragul Football Club players
People from Fitzroy, Victoria